The 1969 Tulsa Golden Hurricane baseball team represented the University of Tulsa in the 1969 NCAA University Division baseball season. The team was coached by Gene Shell in his 5th season at Tulsa.

The Golden Hurricane lost the College World Series, defeated by the Arizona State Sun Devils in the championship game.

Roster

Schedule 

! style="" | Regular Season
|- valign="top" 

|-
! style="" | Postseason
|-

|- align="center" bgcolor="#ccffcc" 
| vs  || Unknown • Tulsa, OK || 5–4 || 35–3 || 1–0
|- align="center" bgcolor="#ccffcc" 
| vs Oklahoma State || Unknown • Tulsa, OK || 8–4 || 36–3 || 2–0
|-

|- align="center" bgcolor="#ccffcc" 
| June 13 || vs UCLA || Johnny Rosenblatt Stadium • Omaha, NE || 6–5 || 37–2 || 1–0
|- align="center" bgcolor="#ccffcc" 
| June 16 || vs Texas || Johnny Rosenblatt Stadium • Omaha, NE || 4–2 || 38–2 || 2–0
|- align="center" bgcolor="#ccffcc" 
| June 17 || vs  || Johnny Rosenblatt Stadium • Omaha, NE || 2–0 || 39–3 || 3–0
|- align="center" bgcolor="#ccffcc" 
| June 18 || vs Arizona State || Johnny Rosenblatt Stadium • Omaha, NE || 11–3 || 39–4 || 4–0
|- align="center" bgcolor="#ffcccc" 
| June 20 || vs Arizona State || Johnny Rosenblatt Stadium • Omaha, NE || 10–1 || 39–5 || 4–1
|-

Awards and honors 
Steve Caves
 All-Tournament Team

Les Rogers
 All-Tournament Team

Golden Hurricane in the 1969 MLB Draft 
The following members of the Tulsa Golden Hurricane baseball program were drafted in the 1969 Major League Baseball Draft.

References 

Tulsa Golden Hurricane baseball seasons
College World Series seasons
Tulsa Golden Hurricane
Tulsa
Missouri Valley Conference baseball champion seasons